Eduardo Hugo Malásquez Maldonado (born 13 October 1957) is a Peruvian former footballer who played at both professional and international levels, as a midfielder.

Career
Born in Lima, Malásquez played club football in Peru, Colombia and Mexico for Deportivo Municipal
, Medellín, Universitario and Atlas. Malásquez earned 33 international caps for Peru between 1979 and 1987. He was a squad member at the 1982 FIFA World Cup, and played in one match during 1986 FIFA World Cup qualification.

References

External links
 

1957 births
Living people
Footballers from Lima
Association football midfielders
Peruvian footballers
Peru international footballers
1982 FIFA World Cup players
1983 Copa América players
1987 Copa América players
Deportivo Municipal footballers
Independiente Medellín footballers
Club Universitario de Deportes footballers
Atlas F.C. footballers
Peruvian Primera División players
Categoría Primera A players
Peruvian expatriate footballers
Peruvian expatriate sportspeople in Mexico
Expatriate footballers in Mexico
Peruvian expatriate sportspeople in Colombia
Expatriate footballers in Colombia